The Auburn Gresham Bungalow Historic District is a residential historic district in the Auburn Gresham neighborhood of Chicago, Illinois. The district includes 264 Chicago bungalows built from 1918 to 1932 along with a variety of other residential buildings. Homeownership became more attainable for working-class Chicagoans in the early twentieth century, and affordable bungalows played a key role in this pattern, with tens of thousands of the homes built in the city. Auburn Gresham, a South Side neighborhood with railroad access and little prior development, was one of the many parts of the city developed during the bungalow boom. While thirty-two different architects designed homes in the district, the bungalows are still relatively similar, as the uniform building design was a major factor in their affordability; however, elements such as color and brickwork distinguish the individual homes.

The district was added to the National Register of Historic Places on October 9, 2012.

References

National Register of Historic Places in Chicago
Historic districts in Chicago
Bungalow architecture in Illinois